Nils Hans Lindman (6 September 1884 – 24 January 1957) was a Swedish football and bandy player. He competed in the 1908 Summer Olympics. In the 1908 tournament, he was the captain of the Swedish football team that finished in 4th place.

References

External links

 

1884 births
1957 deaths
Swedish footballers
Swedish bandy players
Sweden international footballers
Olympic footballers of Sweden
Footballers at the 1908 Summer Olympics
IFK Uppsala Bandy players
IFK Uppsala Fotboll players
Association football midfielders